Girl 27 is a 2007 documentary film by writer/director David Stenn about the 1937 rape of dancer and sometime movie extra Patricia Douglas (1917–2003) at an M-G-M exhibitors' convention, the front-page news stories that followed, and the studio's subsequent cover-up of the crime. Also covered in the film are a similar assault on singer Eloise Spann and her subsequent suicide, and the better-known scandal involving actress Loretta Young and her "adopted" daughter Judy Lewis, the product of her date rape by Clark Gable during the production of The Call of the Wild.

David Stenn uses first-person interviews and vintage film footage and music to explore the political power of movie studios in 1930s Hollywood, as well as public attitudes toward sexual assault that discouraged victims from coming forward. The filmmaker's dogged pursuit of Douglas and their resulting friendship is a consistent theme throughout.

Production
Stenn, who first came across the story while researching his 1993 biography of Jean Harlow, Bombshell, spent a decade in pursuit of the facts relating to the Douglas case – which led to his discovery that Douglas herself was still alive.  He located her and persuaded her to tell her story, which he first detailed in a 2003 Vanity Fair article, "It Happened One Night ... at MGM." In an interview at the time of the film's release, Stenn elaborated on the degree of his personal investment in the project:

You name it, I did it wrong. I used my own money, which is the first no-no of all time, I did everything myself, like legal clearances, our crew was tiny, and I just didn't really know what I was doing. It was based on complete inexperience. I broke a cardinal rule by using my own money, but that turned out to be very liberating because I had complete control. But also I was blowing my savings and thinking, "Is anyone ever going to see this?" There was all that stuff, waking up in the middle of the night in a cold sweat, sitting in the car, crying, thinking, "There's just too much here, I don't know if we're going to get it done." But we did.

The film was picked up for distribution by Red Envelope Entertainment (Netflix), then Magnolia Pictures after its premiere in competition at the Sundance Film Festival.  It has also been selected for inclusion in the film collections of the Museum of Modern Art and the Library of Congress.

Renewed attention and re-evaluation
The revelations regarding sexual misconduct by certain powerful men in the entertainment industry that received widespread media coverage beginning in late 2017 brought renewed attention to Girl 27, which earned fresh recognition for the documentary evidence it provides of the perennial existence of this systemic problem.  In a New York Times op-ed piece in January 2018, Stenn made the point that "Injustice can thrive only in silence, and finally the story of Patricia Douglas and others like her now resonates in Hollywood and beyond."   Actresses Rose McGowan and Jessica Chastain, both prominent figures in the #MeToo movement, have commented favorably about Girl 27 on Twitter, with Chastain stating that the film "should be required viewing for anyone in the film industry."

References

External links
 
 Girl 27 official website

American documentary films
2007 documentary films
2007 films
Documentary films about violence against women
Documentary films about Hollywood, Los Angeles
Documentary films about dance
Metro-Goldwyn-Mayer
Rape in the United States
Sexual abuse cover-ups
History of women in California
2000s English-language films
2000s American films